Mary Rolls née Hillary (also known as Mrs Henry Rolls; 13 September 1775 – 8 April 1835) was an English poet.

Life 
Born on 13 September 1775 to Hannah (née Wynne; 1738–1806) and Richard Hillary (1703–1789) in Westmorland, she was raised as a Quaker along with her older brothers Richard (1768–1803) and William (1771–1847).

She married Henry Rolls (bapt. 1782–1838) on 16 July 1810, at St Anne's Church, Liverpool. He entered Christ's College, Cambridge in December 1810, was ordained in 1813, served a curacy at Boxworth, Cambridgeshire (1813–1816) before becoming rector first of Barnwell St Andrew (1818), Barnwell All Saints (1819), then All Saints Aldwincle (from 1820), all in Northamptonshire. They had at least four daughters and two sons, though only two survived to adulthood, with two of their daughters, Marianna Hillary (1811) and Maria Gulielma (1813), living less than a year.

She died at Aldwincle rectory on 8 April 1835.

Poetry 
Rolls published a number of books of poetry from 1815 to 1828. From 1817 she contributed to several periodicals, including The Literary Gazette, and The Literary Magnet. From 1828 until her death she also contributed to annuals, such as Forget-Me-Not.

Bibliography 
 Sacred Sketches from Scripture History (1815)
 Moscow. A Poem (1816)
 A Poetical Address to Lord Byron (1816)
 The Home of Love, a Poem (1817)
 Legends of the North, or, the Feudal Christmas; a Poem (1825)
 Choice Selections, and Original Effusions; or, Pen and Ink Well Employed (1828)

Notes

References 

1775 births
1835 deaths
19th-century English poets
English women poets
Romantic poets